Windgap GAA is a Gaelic Athletic Association club located in Windgap, County Kilkenny, Ireland. The club was founded in 1954 and is almost exclusively concerned with the game of hurling.

Windgap are a junior club, located in South Kilkenny on the Tipperary border. Senior County hurlers from the club have included Kieran Purcell and Paddy Walsh. Due to low numbers the underage team amalgamated with Galmoy in 2006 and won the "B" league the same year, and they are still joined together in underage levels. Windgap also have a successful senior camogie team. Senior County camogie players from the club include Denise Gaule, Catherine Foley and Michaela Kenneally. The under-16 camogie team won the B County final in 2016.

Honours
 Kilkenny Junior Hurling Championships: (2) 1970, 1986

Notable players
 Denise Gaule
 Kieran Purcell

References

External links
 Windgap GAA website

Hurling clubs in County Kilkenny
Gaelic games clubs in County Kilkenny